The sport of football in the country of Kiribati is run by the Kiribati Islands Football Federation. The sport is popular in the country, likely originating with their previous British rule, and has been played on the islands since 1979 at the latest, with their participation in the 1979 Pacific Games. The association administers the national men's football team and national women's football team as well as national football. For national football there is primarily the Kiribati National Championship, where there's evidence as early as 1984 for the men and 2002 for the women. This covers the whole country, though far flung Kiritimati do not always compete, likely due to financial constraints. In 2021 there was an additional Tarawa Champions League, won by SB Lyke It, though no representative was sent to the OFC Champions League.

Football stadiums in Kiribati

References